Lee Tae-sik (born 26 October 1945) is a South Korean diplomat.

Early life and education
Lee was born in North Gyeongsang Province and graduated from Seoul National University's Department of International Relations in 1970.

Career

Lee then joined the Ministry of Foreign Affairs and Trade, and was employed as first secretary in the South Korean embassy in Washington, D.C. from 1981 to 1984. He later went on to pursue a higher degree at the Johns Hopkins School of Advanced International Studies, graduating in 1988. His first ambassadorial-rank posting was to Israel, from July 2000 to February 2002. He returned to South Korea to serve as Deputy Minister of Foreign Affairs until the following year when he became ambassador to the United Kingdom. In 2005 he had a brief stint back in Seoul as Vice Minister of Foreign Affairs and Trade, before being named as South Korea's ambassador to the U.S. in October 2005. He served in that position until March 2009, when he was replaced by Han Duck-soo.

References

External links
 The Washington Diplomat Newspaper - Ambassador profile 

1945 births
Living people
South Korean diplomats
Ambassadors of South Korea to Israel
Ambassadors of South Korea to the United Kingdom
Ambassadors of South Korea to the United States
Paul H. Nitze School of Advanced International Studies alumni
Seoul National University alumni